Cataprosopus chalybopicta is a species of snout moth in the genus Cataprosopus. It was described by William Warren in 1896 and is known from India.

References

Moths described in 1896
Megarthridiini